The Native Village of Afognak is a federally recognized Alutiiq Alaska Native tribal entity, originally native to the island of Afognak.

Earthquake and relocation 
The Good Friday earthquake of 1964 resulted in the relocation of surviving members of the village of Ag’waneq on the island of Afognak. A new village, Port Lions (named for the Lions Club who helped construct it), was constructed to house the tribe, but many moved on to Kodiak or elsewhere in the United States or Canada.

History 
The history of the Alutiiq goes back more than 7,500 years in the Kodiak Archipelago, but during the late 18th century, the Russian-American Company pressed many of the men of the islands in the area into service hunting otter. This mistreatment and a smallpox epidemic in 1837 lead to increased protections from Russia and the imposition of a system of legislated villages, one of which was Afognak.

The village of Afognak was actually a combination of two former villages known simply as Russian Town and Aleut Town, formed through continual contact between the two groups.

Alaska purchase and statehood 

Many Native traditions were cast aside in 1867 when Alaska was purchased by the United States.

During the period from the purchase of Alaska through its becoming a state in 1959 and until the earthquake in 1964, the quality of life was much lower for the Village of Afognak. Commercial fishing interfered with local sustenance and employment conditions were often far less than ideal.

Government recognition 
In 1971 the Alaska Native Claims Settlement Act resulted in the formation of thirteen regional corporations and a number of "Native Village Corporations" which were recognized by the Bureau of Indian Affairs as tribal entities. The Native Village of Afognak is one such officially designated tribe.  The regional Alaska Native Corporation is Koniag, Inc.  Many members of the Native Village of Afognak also hold shares in one of the region's village corporations, Afognak Native Corporation.  Koniag, Inc. and Afognak Native Corporation are distinct legal entities.

Tribal council 

The tribal council of the Native Village of Afognak consists of seven elected members who sit for three year terms. The council is the official governing body of the tribe as well as managing cultural and land resources and preserving the cultural traditions of the Alutiiq.

Archeology 

In 1994, the Afognak Native Corporation began to build tourism by involving visitors in the archaeological excavation of the old Afognak island village of Ag’waneq in a program called "Dig Afognak". In 1998 the Bureau of Indian Affairs issued a grant to fund the collection and preservation of historic and prehistoric data from the dig and from interviews with Elders of the community.

See also 
List of Alaska Native Tribal Entities

External links 
The Native Village of Afognak Web site
The Alutiiq Ethnographic Bibliography

Alaska Native tribes
Archaeological sites in Alaska
Buildings and structures in Kodiak Island Borough, Alaska